Harat Bar (also Romanized as Harāt Bār and Harāt Bar) is a village in Rahimabad Rural District, Rahimabad District, Rudsar County, Gilan Province, Iran. At the 2006 census, its population was 205, in 54 families.

References 

Populated places in Rudsar County